Gabriel Ochoa Uribe (November 20, 1929 – August 8, 2020) was a Colombian football player and manager. He won four league titles and the Copa Colombia with Millonarios as a player and fourteen league titles as a manager, making him the most successful Colombian coach of all time.

Playing career
Ochoa Uribe started his playing career at the age of 17 in 1946, his first club was América de Cali. In 1959 he joined Millonarios where he won four league titles playing alongside the great Alfredo di Stéfano. In April 1955 he moved for one year to Rio de Janeiro in Brazil not only to play for America FC but also to further his studies in sports medicine. With America FC he became under coach Martim Francisco runner up in the Championship of Rio de Janeiro. Thereafter he returned to Bogotá where he played again for Los Millonarios until 1958 when he took over as coach of the club.

Managerial career
In his first two spells as manager of Millonarios, Ochoa Uribe led them to four league titles. He also had a short spell coaching the Colombia national team.

In 1966 he coached Santa Fe, leading them to the Colombian championship and making them the first Colombian team ever to reach the semi-finals of Copa Libertadores.

He returned to Millonarios between 1970 and 1977, where he won his tenth league title with the club as player and coach with the 1972 league championship.

In 1979, he became manager of América de Cali and led them to seven league championships; they were runners-up in the Copa Libertadores three times consecutively (1985, 1986, 1987). He retired in 1991.

Honours

As player
Millonarios
Colombian league (4): 1949, 1951, 1952, 1953
Copa Colombia (1): 1953

As manager
Millonarios
Colombian league (6): 1959, 1961, 1962, 1963, 1964, 1972

Santa Fe
Colombian league (1): 1966

América de Cali
Colombian league (7): 1979, 1982, 1983, 1984, 1985, 1986, 1990

See also
 List of goalscoring goalkeepers

References

External links
 América profile 

1929 births
2020 deaths
Colombian footballers
Association football goalkeepers
América de Cali footballers
Millonarios F.C. players
America Football Club (RJ) players
Expatriate footballers in Brazil
Colombian football managers
Colombia national football team managers
Millonarios F.C. managers
Independiente Santa Fe managers
América de Cali managers
Colombian expatriate footballers
Sportspeople from Antioquia Department